Nils-Erik Haglund (19 June 1893 – 19 March 1921) was a Swedish swimmer. He competed in the men's 400 metre freestyle event at the 1912 Summer Olympics.

References

External links
 

1893 births
1921 deaths
Olympic swimmers of Sweden
Swimmers at the 1912 Summer Olympics
Swimmers from Stockholm
Swedish male freestyle swimmers